In Greek mythology, Idaea or Idaia (Ancient Greek: Ἰδαία, 'she who comes from Ida' or 'she who lives on Ida') was, by some accounts, the daughter of the Scythian king Dardanus, and the second wife of Phineus, the king of Thrace.  Idaea's false accusations against her stepsons were responsible for her husband's misfortunes. She was sent back to Scythia, where she was condemned to death. Other ancient sources give other names for Phineus' second wife, including: Eidothea, sister of Cadmus, and Eurytia.

Mythology
Idaea's husband was the blind seer Phineus, plagued by the Harpies, who was encountered by Jason and the Argonauts, when they landed in Thrace. By some accounts, it was Phineus' second wife Idaea who was the responsible for her husband's blindness.

According to one tradition, Phineus' first wife was Cleopatra the daughter of Boreas, god of the North wind. Phineus had two sons by Cleopatra (variously named), who were falsely accused by Phineus' second wife Idaea, causing Phineus to (or allow Idaea to) blind, or imprison and torture, or kill his sons. In punishment for this crime against his sons, Phineus was himself blinded.

Sources
Phineus' second wife is first encountered in the works of the fifth-century BC Greek poet Sophocles. His Antigone, has a passing reference to the story, saying simply that Phineus' sons, by his first wife, a daughter of Boreas, were stabbed in the eyes with a shuttle, by their stepmother (not named).  However a scholiast on Apollonius of Rhodes' Argonautica says that, in a (now lost) Sophoclean play, the stepmother was named Idaea, and Phineus himself blinded his sons as a result of Idaea's slander. A scholiast on Antigone says that Sophocles in his Tympanistai mentions Eidothea, sister of Cadmus, along with Idaea, daughter of Dardanus, as alternate possibilities for Phineus' second wife. The same scholiast mentions versions of the story (perhaps Sophoclean) where the stepmother blinds the sons (as in Antigone) and imprisons the sons in a tomb, or accused the sons of rape (and so they are blinded by Phineus as in the scholion to Argonautica).

A scholiast to Homer, Odyssey 12.69, says that according to the Hellenistic mythographer Asclepiades (12F31), Phineus handed his sons over to their stepmother (here named Eurytia) to be killed, after they were slandered (presumably by her). A second-century BC Cyzicene temple contained a bas-relief depicting the stepsons (here named Polymedes and Clytius) killing their "Phrygian stepmother" while their mother Cleopatra looks on with delight.

In the first-century BC account of the Greek historian Diodorus Siculus, the sons were imprisoned, but apparently not blinded. According to Diodorus, when the Argonauts landed in Thrace, they found Phineus' sons shut up inside a burial vault, where they had been continually whipped, having been falsely accused of rape by their stepmother Idaea, the daughter of the Scythian king Dardanus. Rescued by the Argonauts, the sons wanted to torture Idaea to death, but dissuaded by Heracles, they instead sent Idaea back to her father in Scythia, urging him to punish her. And there Idaea was condemned to death.

Just as in the scholion to Antigone, the first- or second-century AD mythographer Apollodorus, says that Phineus' second wife Idaea, the daughter of Dardanus, falsely accused her stepsons (here named Plexippus and Pandion) of rape, so Phineus, believing Idaea, blinded his sons.

Notes

References
 Apollodorus, Apollodorus, The Library, with an English Translation by Sir James George Frazer, F.B.A., F.R.S. in 2 Volumes. Cambridge, MA, Harvard University Press; London, William Heinemann Ltd. 1921.  Online version at the Perseus Digital Library.
 Diodorus Siculus, Diodorus Siculus: The Library of History. Translated by C. H. Oldfather. Twelve volumes. Loeb Classical Library. Cambridge, MA: Harvard University Press; London: William Heinemann, Ltd. 1989. Online version by Bill Thayer
 Gantz, Timothy, Early Greek Myth: A Guide to Literary and Artistic Sources, Johns Hopkins University Press, 1996, Two volumes:  (Vol. 1),  (Vol. 2).
 Grimal, Pierre, The Dictionary of Classical Mythology, Wiley-Blackwell, 1996, .
 Hard, Robin, The Routledge Handbook of Greek Mythology: Based on H.J. Rose's "Handbook of Greek Mythology", Psychology Press, 2004, . Google Books.
 Hyginus, Gaius Julius, Fabulae in Apollodorus' Library and Hyginus' Fabulae: Two Handbooks of Greek Mythology, Translated, with Introductions by R. Scott Smith and Stephen M. Trzaskoma, Hackett Publishing Company,  2007. .
Jebb, Richard Claverhouse, W. G. Headlam, A. C. Pearson, The Fragments of Sophocles, Cambridge University Press, 2017. Volume II Internet Archive
 Paton, W. R. (ed.), Greek Anthology, Volume I: Book 1: Christian Epigrams. Book 2: Description of the Statues in the Gymnasium of Zeuxippus. Book 3: Epigrams in the Temple of Apollonis at Cyzicus. Book 4: Prefaces to the Various Anthologies. Book 5: Erotic Epigrams. Translated by W. R. Paton. Revised by Michael A. Tueller. Loeb Classical Library No. 67. Cambridge, MA: Harvard University Press, 2014. Online version at Harvard University Press.
 Smith, William; Dictionary of Greek and Roman Biography and Mythology, London (1867). Online version at the Perseus Digital Library
 Tripp, Edward, Crowell's Handbook of Classical Mythology, Thomas Y. Crowell Co; First edition (June 1970). .
Princesses in Greek mythology
Queens in Greek mythology